La Esperanza District is one of eleven districts of the Trujillo Province in the La Libertad region, Peru.

Location
La Esperanza District is located in the North - Center of Trujillo Province, between latitudes 08° 04′ 30″ south latitude and 79° 02′ 38″ W, at a distance approximately of 01 km from the main square of Trujillo city.

External links
  Official district web site

References

Districts of the La Libertad Region